The Asian section of the 2022 FIFA World Cup qualification acted as qualifiers for the 2022 FIFA World Cup to be held in Qatar for national teams who are members of the Asian Football Confederation (AFC). Apart from Qatar (who qualified automatically as hosts), a total of 4.5 slots (4 direct slots and 1 inter-confederation play-off slot) in the final tournament were available for AFC teams.

The qualification process involved four rounds; the first two doubled as the qualification for the 2023 AFC Asian Cup. Despite qualifying as hosts, Qatar participated in these rounds to seek Asian Cup qualification. The first round would have acted as qualifiers for the cancelled 2020 AFC Solidarity Cup.

Format
The qualification structure is as follows:
First round: 12 teams (ranked 35–46) played home-and-away over two legs. The six winners advanced to the second round.
Second round: 40 teams (ranked 1–34 and six first-round winners) were divided into eight groups of five teams to play home-and-away round-robin matches. The eight group winners and the four best group runners-up advanced to the third round. Since Qatar won their group, the fifth-best runners-up took their place in the third round.
Third round: 12 teams which advanced from the second round were divided into two groups of six teams to play home-and-away round-robin matches. The top two teams of each group qualified for the World Cup, and the third-placed teams advanced to the fourth round.
Fourth round: Two third-placed teams from the third round played a single match. The winner advanced to the inter-confederation play-offs.

Entrants
All 46 FIFA-affiliated nations from the AFC entered qualification. The FIFA World Rankings of April 2019 were used to determine which nations would compete in the first round. For seeding in the second round and third round draws, the most recent FIFA Rankings prior to those draws will be used.

According to the joint format of the World Cup and Asian Cup qualifiers, both Qatar (as the host nation of the 2022 World Cup) and China (as the host nation of the 2023 Asian Cup) also entered the second round of the qualifiers.

Timor-Leste was banned from participating in the Asian Cup qualification after being found to have fielded a total of 12 ineligible players in 2019 AFC Asian Cup qualification matches among other competitions. However, as FIFA did not ban them from the World Cup qualifiers, Timor-Leste was allowed to enter the competition, but ineligible to qualify for the Asian Cup.

Schedule
The schedule of the competition is expected to be as follows, according to the FIFA International Match Calendar.

On 9 March 2020, FIFA and AFC announced that the second round matches on matchdays 7–10 due to take place in March and June 2020 were postponed by the COVID-19 pandemic, with the new dates to be confirmed. However, subject to approval by FIFA and AFC, and agreement of both member associations, the matches may be played as scheduled provided that the safety of all individuals involved meets the required standards. On 5 June, AFC confirmed that matchdays 7 and 8 were scheduled to take place on 8 and 13 October respectively while matchdays 9 and 10 were also scheduled to kick off on 12 and 17 November. On 12 August, FIFA announced that the matches scheduled for October and November 2020 would be rescheduled to 2021.

On 25 June 2020, FIFA announced that the inter-confederation play-offs, originally scheduled to be played in March 2022, were moved to June.

On 11 November 2020, the AFC Competitions Committee announced that all the Asian qualifiers second round matches should be completed by 15 June 2021 with matchdays 7 and 8 in March 2021 and matchdays 9 and 10 in June 2021 with the final round of the Asian qualifiers beginning in September 2021. Also all 10 matchdays of the Asian qualifiers final round should be finished by the end of March 2022 with the Asian and inter-continental play-offs proposed for the FIFA window of May/June 2022. The Asian play-off for the World Cup in Qatar was proposed as a single match. On the same day, however, FIFA, along with the Bangladeshi and Qatari associations, gave approval to the only second round match originally scheduled for 2020, Qatar v. Bangladesh, which was played on 4 December.

On 19 February 2021, FIFA and AFC postponed the majority of the upcoming matches to June.

First round

The draw for the first round was held on 17 April 2019 at 11:00 MST (UTC+8), at the AFC House in Kuala Lumpur, Malaysia.

Second round

The draw for the second round was held on 17 July 2019 at 17:00 MST (UTC+8), at AFC House in Kuala Lumpur, Malaysia.

Summary

Group A

Group B

Group C

Group D

Group E

Group F

Group G

Group H
North Korea withdrew from the qualifying round due to safety concerns related to the COVID-19 pandemic, therefore the results of their matches were excluded from the group standings.

Ranking of runner-up teams
Since North Korea withdrew from Group H, results against the fifth-placed teams of each group were not counted in determining the ranking of the runner-up teams.

Third round

The third round consisted of two groups of six teams. The first two teams in each group qualified for the World Cup. The two third-placed teams proceeded to the fourth round. The draw was held on 1 July 2021 in Malaysia.

Group A

Group B

Fourth round

The two third-placed teams in each group from the third round played against each other in a single match to determine which team advanced to the inter-confederation play-offs.

The match was played in Doha, Qatar on 7 June 2022.

Inter-confederation play-off

The inter-confederation play-off was determined by a draw held on 26 November 2021. The AFC fourth round winners was drawn against the fifth-placed team from CONMEBOL. The play-off was played as a single match in Qatar on 13 June 2022.

Qualified teams
The following six teams from AFC qualified for the final tournament.

1 Italic indicates hosts for that year.
2 Australia qualified as a member of the OFC in 1974 and 2006 (qualifying took place until 2005 and they left the OFC and joined the AFC in 2006).

Top goalscorers

Below are full goalscorer lists for each round:

First round
Second round
Third round
Fourth round

See also
2023 AFC Asian Cup qualification

Notes

References

External links

Qualifiers – Asia, FIFA.com
FIFA World Cup, The-AFC.com

 
Afc
FIFA World Cup qualification (AFC)
2019 in Asian football
2020 in Asian football
2021 in Asian football
2022 in Asian football